This is a list of the events of World War I in chronological order.

1914

1915

1916

1917

1918

1919

1920

Post-1920

Notes

See also
 Diplomatic history of World War I

References

Further reading

External links
 
 
 
 
 
 "World War I: Declarations of War from around the Globe". Law Library of Congress.
 

World War I
Timeline
United States military history timelines